Kevin M. Donegan (born 1958) is a former United States Navy vice admiral. He last served as the Director of Navy Staff and Deputy Chief of Naval Operations for Operations, Plans and Strategy. Before that, he was the commander of the United States Fifth Fleet from September 3, 2015  to September 2017. Earlier in his career, Donegan was a United States Naval Aviator and had various command roles within both operating forces and the shore establishment. He retired from the Navy on August 1, 2018.

Education 
Donegan received a Bachelor of Science in aerospace engineering from the University of Virginia in 1980. He also attended United States Naval Test Pilot School, where he graduated as the outstanding student, the United States Navy Strike Fighter Tactics Instructor program, United States Navy Nuclear Power School, the USAF Air Command and Staff College, the Joint Forces Staff College, and Harvard Kennedy School of Government's Executive Education Program in National and International Security.

2016 U.S-Iran naval incident 

Donegan presided over the capture of 10 U.S. Navy sailors by Iran's revolutionary guards on January 12, 2016. These sailors were released in 15 hours without incident.

Awards and decorations

References 

University of Virginia School of Engineering and Applied Science alumni
United States Naval Aviators
United States Navy vice admirals
United States Naval Test Pilot School alumni
Harvard Kennedy School alumni
Recipients of the Navy Distinguished Service Medal
Recipients of the Air Medal
1958 births
Living people